Michelle Burgher (born 12 March 1977 in Kingston, Jamaica) is a track and field athlete, competing internationally for Jamaica.

Career

She was a bronze medalist in the 4 × 400 m relay at the 2004 Olympic Games in Athens, Greece.

She conducts coaching clinics and talks for school kids. Her ambition is to become a pediatric psychologist. Her hobbies are redecorating her flat and dancing.

In 2008, Burgher joined the track and field coaching staff at the Indiana University of Pennsylvania in Indiana, PA. The move reunited Burgher with IUP's head coach, Ralph White. White coached Burgher at Clemson and she was an assistant coach under White at Williams from 2001 to 2004.1

Achievements

Notes

References
 Greensburg Tribune Review 8 Aug 2008: C14. See also: https://archive.today/20130131125044/http://www.pittsburghlive.com/x/pittsburghtrib/news/regional/s_581817.html

External links
 
 
 
 Picture of Michelle Burgher

1977 births
Living people
Sportspeople from Kingston, Jamaica
Jamaican female sprinters
Jamaican female hurdlers
Athletes (track and field) at the 2000 Summer Olympics
Athletes (track and field) at the 2004 Summer Olympics
Olympic athletes of Jamaica
Olympic silver medalists for Jamaica
Olympic bronze medalists for Jamaica
Clemson Tigers women's track and field athletes
Athletes (track and field) at the 2003 Pan American Games
Medalists at the 2004 Summer Olympics
Medalists at the 2000 Summer Olympics
Olympic silver medalists in athletics (track and field)
Olympic bronze medalists in athletics (track and field)
Pan American Games medalists in athletics (track and field)
Pan American Games silver medalists for Jamaica
World Athletics Championships winners
Medalists at the 2003 Pan American Games